The Porter is a Canadian television drama series which premiered on CBC Television on 21 February 2022. Created by Arnold Pinnock and Bruce Ramsay, the series is a co-production between CBC and BET+. The show was released to positive reviews and became the most nominated show at the 11th Canadian Screen Awards. The show was cancelled after one season, after BET+ decided to not back any future episodes.

Premise
The series depicts the history of Black Canadian and African-American men who worked as Pullman porters in the period following World War I, leading to the 1925 creation of the Brotherhood of Sleeping Car Porters as the first Black-led labour union.

Cast
 Aml Ameen as Junior Massey, a porter with the transcontinental railroad
 Ronnie Rowe Jr. as  Zeke Garrett, a porter and war buddy of Junior
 Mouna Traoré as Marlene Massey, a worker with the Black Cross Nurses
 Alfre Woodard as Fay, a Montréal business owner
 Oluniké Adeliyi as Queenie, a powerful Chicago crime boss
 Loren Lott as Lucy, a performer
 Djouliet Amara as Corrine
 Arnold Pinnock as Glenford
 Bruce Ramsay as Dinger
 Luke Bilyk as Franklin Edwards
 Jahron Wilson as Teddy Massey, Junior and Marlene's son

Episodes

Production

Development
On 10 December 2020, CBC Television and BET+ announced that they would be partnering on the creation of a series about a group of railway workers who formed the first Black-led labour union. The series from Inferno Picture and Sienna Films was created by Arnold Pinnock and Bruce Ramsay, with the participation of Annmarie Morais, Marsha Greene, Charles Officer and R.T. Thorne as producers, with Officer and Thorne also directing. The series is written by Morais, Greene, Andrew Burrows-Trotman, Priscilla White, Pinnock and Ramsay, with R.T. Thorne participating in the writers' room. Filming took place primarily in Winnipeg, Manitoba, Canada between June and September 2021.

Casting
In April 2021 CBC and BET+ announced the main cast was slated to include Aml Ameen, Ronnie Rowe Jr., Mouna Traoré. In June Oluniké Adeliyi and Loren Lott joined the cast, with creators Arnold Pinnock and Bruce Ramsay also taking on series regular roles. In July 2021, it was announced that Alfre Woodard would be joining the cast in a recurring role.

Thorne stated that there was "so much incredible talent across this country" from which to cast for the series.

Release
In addition to the CBC, the series was released in the United States on 5 May 2022 on BET+. In February 2023, the show was cancelled after one season.

Reception

Critical Reception 
The first season received positive reviews from critics. On the review aggregation website Rotten Tomatoes, the season holds an approval rating of 100% with an average rating of 8.4 out of 10, based on 7 reviews.

After the first episode aired, a review in The Globe and Mail stated that the show "is great TV...with compelling characters" and referred to it as "one sexy show".

Accolades 
The Porter was the most nominated show at the 11th Canadian Screen Awards.

References

External links
 
 

2022 Canadian television series debuts
CBC Television original programming
Television shows set in Montreal
Television shows set in Chicago
Television shows filmed in Winnipeg
2020s Canadian drama television series
2020s Black Canadian television series
BET+ original programming